Now That's What I Call Faith! was released on March 23, 2010.

Track listing

Charts

References

2010 compilation albums
Faith